San Xoán de Río is a municipality in the Ourense province of Galicia, an Autonomous Community in northwestern Spain. It is located in the north of the province. Named after Saint John (San Xoán), the local patron. The village of Domecelle is located within the municipality.

References  

Municipalities in the Province of Ourense